Eldar Aleksandrovich Ryazanov (18 November 1927 – 30 November 2015) was a Soviet and Russian film director, screenwriter, poet, actor and pedagogue whose popular comedies, satirizing the daily life of the Soviet Union and Russia, are celebrated throughout the former Soviet Union and former Warsaw Pact countries.

Biography
Eldar Aleksandrovich Ryazanov was born in Samara. His father, Aleksandr Semyonovich Ryazanov, was a diplomat who worked in Tehran. His mother, Sofya Mikhailovna (née Shusterman), was of Jewish descent.

In 1930, the family moved to Moscow, and soon his parents divorced. He was then raised by his mother and her new husband, Lev Mikhailovich Kopp. In 1937 his father was arrested by the Stalinist government and subsequently served 18 years in the correctional labour camps.

Ryazanov began to create films in the early 1950s. In 1955, Ivan Pyryev, then a major force in the Soviet film industry, suggested to him to begin work on his film Carnival Night. At first, Ryazanov refused, as he wanted to make "serious films", but then was convinced to begin, as Pyryev believed that "anybody could shoot a melodrama, but only a few can create good comedy." He won instant success, and began to release more films.

He was named a People's Artist of the USSR in 1984, and received the USSR State Prize in 1977. He won the Nika Award for Best Director in 1991 for the film Promised Heaven.

Among his most famous films are Carnival Night (1955), Hussar Ballad (1962), Beware of the Car (1966), The Irony of Fate (1975), Office Romance (1977), The Garage (1980), A Railway Station for Two (1982) and A Cruel Romance (1984). Ryazanov's main genre was tragicomedy.

Illness and death
Ryazanov had an acute ischemic stroke in November 2014. He was admitted to a Moscow hospital on 21 November 2015 due to shortness of breath. He died around midnight on 30 November 2015, of heart and lung failure, at the age of 88.

Legacy
Ryazanov was one of the most successful film directors of the Soviet Union, and his films are still well-known in the post-USSR landscape. The Irony of Fate is still aired every December 31 in most post-USSR countries, except for Ukraine since the 2014 Revolution of Dignity. A street in Moscow was named after him in 2017, and a museum and memorial dedicated to his memory was opened on the site of his childhood home in Samara.

Honours and awards
Order "For Merit to the Fatherland";
2nd class (3 July 2008) – for outstanding contribution to the development of national cinema and many years of creative activity
3rd class (20 June 1996) – for services to the state, an outstanding contribution to the development of national cinema and culture
Order of the Red Banner of Labour, twice (1969, 1977)
Order of Friendship of Peoples (1987)
Order of the "Key of Friendship" (Kemerovo Region, 2007)
Commander of the Order of Arts and Letters (France)
Commander of the Order of Honour (Georgia) (2008)
People's Artist of the RSFSR (1974)
People's Artist of the USSR (1984)
USSR State Prize (1977) (for the film "Irony of Fate, or Enjoy Your Bath!")
Vasilyev Brothers State Prize of the RSFSR (1979) (for the film "Office Romance")
Winner of the All-Union Film Festival in the "First Prize among the comedies" for 1958
Winner of the All-Union Film Festival in the "Special Award" for 1983
Nika awards;
Best Director (1991)
Best Fiction Film (1991)
Honour and dignity (2006)
Winner of Tsarskoye Selo Art Prize (2005)
The asteroid 4258 Ryazanov is named after him.

Filmography
1950 They are Studying in Moscow (Oni Uchatsya v Moskve), documentary – author (in co-operation with Z. Fomina)
1951 The Way Named October (Doroga imeni Oktyabrya), documentary – Director (in co-operation with L. Derbysheva)
1952 On the World Chess 8Championship (Na Pervenstve mira po shakhmatam), documentary – Director
1953 Your Books (Tvoi Knizhki), documentary – Director (in co-operation with Z. Fomina)
1953 Near Krasnodar (Nedaleko ot Krasnodara), documentary – Director
1954 Island of Sakhalin (Ostrov Sakhalin), documentary – Director
1955 Spring Voices (Весенние голоса), documentary - second Director
1956 Carnival Night (Карнавальная ночь) – Director
1957 The Girl Without Address (Девушка без адреса) – Director
1961 How Robinson Was Created (Как создавался Робинзон) – Director
1961 The Man from Nowhere (Человек ниоткуда) – Director
1962 Hussar Ballad (Гусарская баллада) – Director / Screenwriter
1965 Give me a complaints book (Дайте жалобную книгу) – Director / Actor: Chief editor
1966 Beware of the Car (Берегись автомобиля) – Director / Screenwriter
1968 Zigzag of Success (Зигзаг удачи) – Director / Screenwriter
1971 Grandads-Robbers (Старики-разбойники) – Director / Screenwriter / Actor: The Passer-by
1974 Unbelievable Adventures of Italians in Russia (Невероятные приключения итальянцев в России) / Director / Screenwriter / Actor: Doctor
1975 The Irony of Fate (Ирония судьбы или с легким паром!) – Director / Screenwriter / Actor: Airplane Passenger
1977 Office Romance (Служебный роман) – Director / Screenwriter / Actor: Bus Passenger
1979 The Garage (Гараж) – Director / Screenwriter / Actor: Sleeping Man
1981 Say a Word for the Poor Hussar (О бедном гусаре замолвите слово) – Director / Screenwriter / Actor: Confectioner
1982 Station for Two (Вокзал для двоих) – Director / Screenwriter / Actor: Railroad Supervisor
1984 A Cruel Romance (Жестокий романс) – Director / Screenwriter
1987 Forgotten Melody for a Flute (Забытая мелодия для флейты) – Director / Screenwriter / Actor: Astronomer
1988 Dear Yelena Sergeyevna (Дорогая Елена Сергеевна) – Director / Screenwriter / Actor: Neighbour
1991 Promised Heaven (Небеса обетованные) – Director / Screenwriter / Actor: Man in Diner
1993 Prediction (Предсказание) – Director / Screenwriter 
1996 Hello, Fools! (Привет, дуралеи!) – Director / Screenwriter / Actor: Manager of the bookshop
2000 Old Hags (Старые клячи) – Director / Screenwriter / Actor: Judge
2000 Still Waters (Тихие омуты) – Director / Screenwriter / Actor: Radiologist / Producer
2003 The Key of Bedroom (Ключи от спальни) – Director / Screenwriter / Actor: Police constable / Producer
2006 Carnival Night 2 (TV) – Director / Actor (Cameo appearance)
2006 Andersen. Life Without Love – Director / Screenwriter (with I. Kvirikadze) / Actor: Mortician / Producer
2007 The Irony of Fate 2 – Actor (Cameo appearance)

References

Additional sources
David MacFadyen, The Sad Comedy of Elʹdar Riazanov: An Introduction to Russia's Most Popular Filmmaker, McGill-Queen's Press: 2003,

External links

  
 
 
Russian fan site

1927 births
2015 deaths
20th-century Russian dramatists and playwrights
20th-century Russian male actors
20th-century Russian poets
21st-century Russian dramatists and playwrights
21st-century Russian male actors
21st-century Russian poets
Writers from Samara, Russia
Academicians of the Russian Academy of Cinema Arts and Sciences "Nika"
Chevaliers of the Légion d'honneur
Chevaliers of the Ordre des Arts et des Lettres
Commandeurs of the Ordre des Arts et des Lettres
Gerasimov Institute of Cinematography alumni
Academic staff of High Courses for Scriptwriters and Film Directors
People's Artists of the RSFSR
People's Artists of the USSR
Recipients of the Nika Award
Recipients of the Order "For Merit to the Fatherland", 2nd class
Recipients of the Order "For Merit to the Fatherland", 3rd class
Recipients of the Order of Friendship of Peoples
Recipients of the Order of Honor (Georgia)
Recipients of the Order of the Red Banner of Labour
Recipients of the USSR State Prize
Recipients of the Vasilyev Brothers State Prize of the RSFSR
Russian people of Jewish descent
Soviet people of Jewish descent
Russian documentary filmmakers
Russian dramatists and playwrights
Russian film directors
Russian male film actors
Russian male poets
20th-century Russian screenwriters
Male screenwriters
20th-century Russian male writers
Russian television presenters
Soviet documentary film directors
Soviet dramatists and playwrights
Soviet film directors
Soviet male film actors
Soviet male poets
Soviet screenwriters
Soviet television presenters
Burials at Novodevichy Cemetery
Actors from Samara, Russia